The national debt of the United States is the total national debt owed by the federal government of the United States to Treasury security holders. The national debt at any point in time is the face value of the then-outstanding Treasury securities that have been issued by the Treasury and other federal agencies. The terms "national deficit" and "national surplus" usually refer to the federal government budget balance from year to year, not the cumulative amount of debt. In a deficit year the national debt increases as the government needs to borrow funds to finance the deficit, while in a surplus year the debt decreases as more money is received than spent, enabling the government to reduce the debt by buying back some Treasury securities. In general, government debt increases as a result of government spending and decreases from tax or other receipts, both of which fluctuate during the course of a fiscal year. There are two components of gross national debt:

 "Debt held by the public" – such as Treasury securities held by investors outside the federal government, including those held by individuals, corporations, the Federal Reserve, and foreign, state and local governments.
 "Debt held by government accounts" or "intragovernmental debt" – is non-marketable Treasury securities held in accounts of programs administered by the federal government, such as the Social Security Trust Fund. Debt held by government accounts represents the cumulative surpluses, including interest earnings, of various government programs that have been invested in Treasury securities.

Historically, the U.S. public debt as a share of gross domestic product (GDP) increases during wars and recessions and then subsequently declines. The ratio of debt to GDP may decrease as a result of a government surplus or via growth of GDP and inflation. For example, debt held by the public as a share of GDP had peaked just after World War II (113% of GDP in 1945), but has since reached new highs of up to 134.84% of GDP during the second quarter of 2020. In recent decades, aging demographics and rising healthcare costs have led to concern about the long-term sustainability of the federal government's fiscal policies. The aggregate, gross amount that Treasury can borrow is limited by the United States debt ceiling.

As of November 2022, federal debt held by the public was $31 trillion. Debt held by the public was estimated at 96.19% of GDP, and approximately 33% of this public debt was owned by foreigners. The United States has the largest external debt in the world. The total number of U.S. Treasury securities held by foreign countries in December 2021 was $7.7 trillion, up from $7.1 trillion in December 2020. As of February 2022, total US federal government debt breached $30 trillion mark for the first time in history.

During the COVID-19 pandemic, the federal government spent trillions in virus aid and economic relief. The CBO estimated that the budget deficit for fiscal year 2020 would increase to $3.3 trillion or 16% GDP, more than triple that of 2019 and the largest as % GDP since 1945.

On April 28, 2022, the Congressional Budget Office released a report which stated that in order to stabilize the $30 trillion in national debt (i.e. stop the debt from growing relative to the United States economy), it will require that "income tax receipts or benefit payments change substantially from their currently projected path." In other words, taxes will likely increase and government services will likely have to be reduced.

History

The United States federal government has continuously had a fluctuating public debt since its formation in 1789, except for about a year during 1835–1836, a period in which the nation, during the presidency of Andrew Jackson, completely paid the national debt. To allow comparisons over the years, public debt is often expressed as a ratio to GDP. The United States public debt as a percentage of GDP reached its highest level during Harry Truman's first presidential term, during and after World War II. Public debt as a percentage of GDP fell rapidly in the post-World War II period and reached a low in 1974 under Richard Nixon. Debt as a share of GDP has consistently increased since then, except during the presidencies of Jimmy Carter and Bill Clinton.

Public debt rose sharply during the 1980s, as Ronald Reagan negotiated with Congress to cut tax rates and increase military spending. It fell during the 1990s because of decreased military spending, increased taxes and the 1990s boom. Public debt rose sharply during George W. Bush's presidency and in the wake of the 2007–2008 financial crisis, with resulting significant tax revenue declines and spending increases, such as the Emergency Economic Stabilization Act of 2008 and the American Recovery and Reinvestment Act of 2009.

In their September 2018 monthly report published on October 5 and based on data from the Treasury Department's "Daily Treasury Statements" (DTS), the Congressional Budget Office (CBO) wrote that the federal budget deficit was c.$782 billion for the fiscal year 2018—which runs from October 2017 through September 2018. This is $116 billion more than in FY2017. The Treasury statements as summarized by in the CBO report that corporate taxes for 2017 and 2018 declined by $92 billion representing a drop of 31%. The CBO added that "about half of the decline ... occurred since June" when some of the provisions of the Tax Cuts and Jobs Act of 2017 took effect, which included the "new lower corporate tax rate and the expanded ability to immediately deduct the full value of equipment purchases".

According to articles in The Wall Street Journal and Business Insider, based on documents released on October 29, 2018, by the Treasury Department, the department's projection estimated that by the fourth quarter of the FY2018, it would have issued c. $1.338 trillion in debt. This would have been the highest debt issuance since 2010, when it reached $1.586 trillion. The Treasury anticipated that the total "net marketable debt"—net marketable securities—issued in the fourth quarter would reach $425 billion; which would raise the 2018 "total debt issuance" to over a trillion dollars of new debt, representing a "146% jump from 2017". According to the Journal that is the highest fourth quarter issuance "since 2008, at the height of the financial crisis." As cited by the Journal and the Business Insider, the primary drivers of new debt issuance are "stagnant", "sluggish tax revenues", a decrease in "corporate tax revenue", due to the GOP Tax Cuts and Jobs Act of 2017, the "bipartisan budget agreement", and "higher government spending".

Valuation and measurement

Public and government accounts

As of July 20, 2020, debt held by the public was $20.57 trillion, and intragovernmental holdings were $5.94 trillion, for a total of $26.51 trillion.  Debt held by the public was approximately 77% of GDP in 2017, ranked 43rd highest out of 207 countries. The CBO forecast in April 2018 that the ratio will rise to nearly 100% by 2028, perhaps higher if current policies are extended beyond their scheduled expiration date.

The national debt can also be classified into marketable or non-marketable securities. Most of the marketable securities are Treasury notes, bills, and bonds held by investors and governments globally. The non-marketable securities are mainly the "government account series" owed to certain government trust funds such as the Social Security Trust Fund, which represented $2.82 trillion in 2017.

The non-marketable securities represent amounts owed to program beneficiaries. For example, in the cash upon receipt but spent for other purposes. If the government continues to run deficits in other parts of the budget, the government will have to issue debt held by the public to fund the Social Security Trust Fund, in effect exchanging one type of debt for the other. Other large intragovernmental holders include the Federal Housing Administration, the Federal Savings and Loan Corporation's Resolution Fund and the Federal Hospital Insurance Trust Fund (Medicare).

Accounting treatment

Only debt held by the public is reported as a liability on the consolidated financial statements of the United States government. Debt held by US government accounts is an asset to those accounts but a liability to the Treasury; they offset each other in the consolidated financial statements. Government receipts and expenditures are normally presented on a cash rather than an accrual basis, although the accrual basis may provide more information on the longer-term implications of the government's annual operations. The United States public debt is often expressed as a ratio of public debt to GDP. The ratio of debt to GDP may decrease as a result of a government surplus as well as from growth of GDP and inflation.

Fannie Mae and Freddie Mac obligations excluded

Under normal accounting rules, fully owned companies would be consolidated into the books of their owners, but the large size of Fannie Mae and Freddie Mac has made the U.S. government reluctant to incorporate them into its own books. When the two mortgage companies required bail-outs, White House Budget Director Jim Nussle, on September 12, 2008, initially indicated their budget plans would not incorporate the government-sponsored enterprise (GSE) debt into the budget because of the temporary nature of the conservator intervention.  As the intervention has dragged out, pundits began to question this accounting treatment, noting that changes in August 2012 "makes them even more permanent wards of the state and turns the government's preferred stock into a permanent, perpetual kind of security".

The federal government controls the Public Company Accounting Oversight Board, which would normally criticize inconsistent accounting practices, but it does not oversee its own government's accounting practices or the standards set by the Federal Accounting Standards Advisory Board. The on- or off-balance sheet obligations of those two independent GSEs was just over $5 trillion at the time the conservatorship was put in place, consisting mainly of mortgage payment guarantees and agency bonds. The confusing independent but government-controlled status of the GSEs resulted in investors of the legacy common shares and preferred shares launching various activist campaigns in 2014.

Guaranteed obligations excluded 

U.S. federal government guarantees were not included in the public debt total as they were not drawn against. In late 2008, the federal government had guaranteed large amounts of obligations of mutual funds, banks, and corporations under several programs designed to deal with the problems arising from the late-2000s financial crisis. The guarantee program lapsed at the end of 2012, when Congress declined to extend the scheme. The funding of direct investments made in response to the crisis, such as those made under the Troubled Asset Relief Program, was included in the debt totals.

Unfunded obligations excluded 

The U.S. federal government is obligated under current law to make mandatory payments for programs such as Medicare, Medicaid and Social Security. The Government Accountability Office (GAO) projects that payouts for these programs will significantly exceed tax revenues over the next 75 years. The Medicare Part A (hospital insurance) payouts already exceed program tax revenues, and social security payouts exceeded payroll taxes in fiscal year 2010. These deficits require funding from other tax sources or borrowing. The present value of these deficits or unfunded obligations is an estimated $45.8 trillion. This is the amount that would have had to be set aside in 2009 in order to pay for the unfunded obligations which, under current law, will have to be raised by the government in the future. Approximately $7.7 trillion relates to Social Security, while $38.2 trillion relates to Medicare and Medicaid. In other words, health care programs will require nearly five times more funding than Social Security. Adding this to the national debt and other federal obligations would bring total obligations to nearly $62 trillion. However, these unfunded obligations are not counted in the national debt, as shown in monthly Treasury reports of the national debt.

Measuring debt burden 

GDP is a measure of the total size and output of the economy. One measure of the debt burden is its size relative to GDP, called the "debt-to-GDP ratio". Mathematically, this is the debt divided by the GDP amount. The Congressional Budget Office includes historical budget and debt tables along with its annual "Budget and Economic Outlook". Debt held by the public as a percentage of GDP rose from 34.7% GDP in 2000 to 40.5% in 2008 and 67.7% in 2011. Mathematically, the ratio can decrease even while debt grows if the rate of increase in GDP (which also takes account of inflation) is higher than the rate of increase of debt. Conversely, the debt to GDP ratio can increase even while debt is being reduced, if the decline in GDP is sufficient.

According to the CIA World Factbook, during 2015, the U.S. debt to GDP ratio of 73.6% was the 39th highest in the world. This was measured using "debt held by the public." However, $1 trillion in additional borrowing since the end of FY 2015 raised the ratio to 76.2% as of April 2016 [See Appendix#National debt for selected years]. Also, this number excludes state and local debt. According to the OECD, general government gross debt (federal, state, and local) in the United States in the fourth quarter of 2015 was $22.5 trillion (125% of GDP); subtracting out $5.25 trillion for intragovernmental federal debt to count only federal "debt held by the public" gives 96% of GDP.

The ratio is higher if the total national debt is used, by adding the "intragovernmental debt" to the "debt held by the public." For example, on April 29, 2016, debt held by the public was approximately $13.84 trillion or about 76% of GDP. Intra-governmental holdings stood at $5.35 trillion, giving a combined total public debt of $19.19 trillion. U.S. GDP for the previous 12 months was approximately $18.15 trillion, for a total debt to GDP ratio of approximately 106%.

Calculating the annual change in debt

Conceptually, an annual deficit (or surplus) should represent the change in the national debt, with a deficit adding to the national debt and a surplus reducing it. However, there is complexity in the budgetary computations that can make the deficit figure commonly reported in the media (the "total deficit") considerably different from the annual increase in the debt. The major categories of differences are the treatment of the Social Security program, Treasury borrowing, and supplemental appropriations outside the budget process.

Social Security payroll taxes and benefit payments, along with the net balance of the U.S. Postal Service, are considered "off-budget", while most other expenditure and receipt categories are considered "on-budget". The total federal deficit is the sum of the on-budget deficit (or surplus) and the off-budget deficit (or surplus). Since FY1960, the federal government has run on-budget deficits except for FY1999 and FY2000, and total federal deficits except in FY1969 and FY1998–FY2001.

For example, in January 2009 the CBO reported that for FY2008, the "on-budget deficit" was $638 billion, offset by an "off-budget surplus" (mainly due to Social Security revenue in excess of payouts) of $183 billion, for a "total deficit" of $455 billion. This latter figure is the one commonly reported in the media. However, an additional $313 billion was required for "the Treasury actions aimed at stabilizing the financial markets," an unusually high amount because of the subprime mortgage crisis.  This meant that the "debt held by the public" increased by $768 billion ($455B + $313B = $768B). The "off-budget surplus" was borrowed and spent (as is typically the case), increasing the "intra-governmental debt" by $183 billion. So the total increase in the "national debt" in FY2008 was $768B +$183B = $951 billion. The Treasury Department reported an increase in the national debt of $1,017B for FY2008. The $66 billion difference is likely from "supplemental appropriations" for the War on Terror, some of which were outside the budget process entirely until President Obama began including most of them in his FY2010 budget.

In other words, spending the "off budget" Social Security surplus adds to the total national debt (by increasing the intragovernmental debt) while the "off-budget" surplus reduces the "total" deficit reported in the media. Certain spending called "supplemental appropriations" is outside the budget process entirely but adds to the national debt. Funding for the Iraq and Afghanistan wars was accounted for this way prior to the Obama administration. Certain stimulus measures and earmarks were also outside the budget process. The federal government publishes the total debt owed (public and intragovernmental holdings) daily.

Reduction

Negative real interest rates
Since 2010, the U.S. Treasury has been obtaining negative real interest rates on government debt, meaning the inflation rate is greater than the interest rate paid on the debt. Such low rates, outpaced by the inflation rate, occur when the market believes that there are no alternatives with sufficiently low risk, or when popular institutional investments such as insurance companies, pensions, or bond, money market, and balanced mutual funds are required or choose to invest sufficiently large sums in Treasury securities to hedge against risk. Economist Lawrence Summers states that at such low interest rates, government borrowing actually saves taxpayer money and improves creditworthiness.

In the late 1940s through the early 1970s, the U.S. and UK both reduced their debt burden by about 30% to 40% of GDP per decade by taking advantage of negative real interest rates, but there is no guarantee that government debt rates will continue to stay this low. Between 1946 and 1974, the U.S. debt-to-GDP ratio fell from 121% to 32% even though there were surpluses in only eight of those years which were much smaller than the deficits.

Raising reserve requirements and full reserve banking 
Two economists, Jaromir Benes and Michael Kumhof, working for the International Monetary Fund, published a working paper called The Chicago Plan Revisited suggesting that the debt could be eliminated by raising bank reserve requirements and converting from fractional-reserve banking to full-reserve banking. Economists at the Paris School of Economics have commented on the plan, stating that it is already the status quo for coinage currency, and a Norges Bank economist has examined the proposal in the context of considering the finance industry as part of the real economy. A Centre for Economic Policy Research paper agrees with the conclusion that "no real liability is created by new fiat money creation and therefore public debt does not rise as a result."

Debt ceiling

The debt ceiling is a legislative mechanism to limit the amount of national debt that can be issued by the Treasury. In effect, it restrains the Treasury from paying for expenditures after the limit has been reached, even if the expenditures have already been approved (in the budget) and have been appropriated. If this situation were to occur, it is unclear whether Treasury would be able to prioritize payments on debt to avoid a default on its debt obligations, but it would have to default on some of its non-debt obligations.

Debt holdings 

Because a large variety of people own the notes, bills, and bonds in the "public" portion of the debt, the Treasury also publishes information that groups the types of holders by general categories to portray who owns United States debt. In this data set, some of the public portion is moved and combined with the total government portion, because this amount is owned by the Federal Reserve as part of United States monetary policy. (See Federal Reserve System.)

As is apparent from the chart, a little less than half of the total national debt is owed to the "Federal Reserve and intragovernmental holdings". The foreign and international holders of the debt are also put together from the notes, bills, and bonds sections. To the right is a chart for the data as of June 2008:

Foreign holdings

As of October 2018, foreigners owned $6.2 trillion of U.S. debt, or approximately 39% of the debt held by the public of $16.1 trillion and 28% of the total debt of $21.8 trillion. In December 2020, foreigners held 33% ($7 trillion out of $21.6 trillion) of publicly held US debt; of this $7 trillion, $4.1 trillion (59.2%) belonged to foreign governments and $2.8 trillion (40.8%) to foreign investors. Including both private and public debt holders, the top three December 2020 national holders of American public debt are Japan ($1.2 trillion or 17.7%), China ($1.1 trillion or 15.2%), and the United Kingdom ($0.4 trillion or 6.2%).

Historically, the share held by foreign governments had grown over time, rising from 13% of the public debt in 1988 to 34% in 2015. In more recent years, foreign ownership has retreated both in percent of total debt and total dollar amounts.  China's maximum holding of 9.1% or $1.3 trillion of U.S. debt occurred in 2011, subsequently reduced to 5% in 2018.  Japan's maximum holding of 7% or $1.2 trillion occurred in 2012, subsequently reduced to 4% in 2018.

According to Paul Krugman, "America actually earns more from its assets abroad than it pays to foreign investors." Nonetheless, the country's net international investment position represents a debt of more than $9 trillion.

Forecasting

CBO ten-year outlook 2018–2028 (pre–COVID-19 pandemic)
The CBO estimated the impact of the Tax Cuts and Jobs Act and separate spending legislation over the 2018–2028 period in their annual "Budget & Economic Outlook", released in April 2018:
 The budget deficit in fiscal 2018 (which runs from October 1, 2017, to September 30, 2018, the first year budgeted by President Trump) is forecast to be $804 billion, an increase of $139 billion (21%) from the $665 billion in 2017 and up $242 billion (39%) over the previous baseline forecast (June 2017) of $580 billion for 2018.  The June 2017 forecast was essentially the budget trajectory inherited from President Obama; it was prepared prior to the Tax Act and spending increases under President Trump.
 For the 2018–2027 period, CBO projects the sum of the annual deficits (i.e., debt increase) to be $11.7 trillion, an increase of $1.6 trillion (16%) over the previous baseline (June 2017) forecast of $10.1 trillion.
 The $1.6 trillion debt increase includes three main elements:
$1.7 trillion less in revenues due to the tax cuts;
$1.0 trillion more in spending; and 
Partially offsetting incremental revenue of $1.1 trillion due to higher economic growth than previously forecast.
 Debt held by the public is expected (Congressional Budget Office Outlook) to rise from 78% of GDP ($16 trillion) at the end of 2018 to 96% GDP ($29 trillion) by 2028. That would be the highest level since the end of World War II.
 CBO estimated under an alternative scenario (in which policies in place as of April 2018 are maintained beyond scheduled initiation or expiration) that deficits would be considerably higher, rising by $13.7 trillion over the 2018–2027 period, an increase of $3.6 trillion over the June 2017 baseline forecast. Maintaining current policies for example would include extending the individual Trump tax cuts past their scheduled expiration in 2025, among other changes.
 The debt increase of $1.6 trillion represents approximately $12,700 per household (assuming 126.2 million households in 2017), while the $3.6 trillion represents $28,500 per household.

CBO ten-year outlook 2020–2030 (during the COVID-19 pandemic)
The CBO estimated that the budget deficit for fiscal year 2020 would increase to $3.3 trillion or 16% GDP, more than triple that of 2019 and the largest as % GDP since 1945, because of the impact of the COVID-19 pandemic. CBO also forecast the debt held by the public would rise to 98% GDP in 2020, compared with 79% in 2019 and 35% in 2007 before the Great Recession.

CBO long-term outlook

The CBO reports its Long-Term Budget Outlook annually, providing at least two scenarios for spending, revenue, deficits, and debt. The 2019 Outlook mainly covers the 30-year period through 2049. The CBO reported:

Large budget deficits over the next 30 years are projected to drive federal debt held by the public to unprecedented levels—from 78 percent of gross domestic product (GDP) in 2019 to 144 percent by 2049. That projection incorporates CBO's central estimates of various factors, such as productivity growth and interest rates on federal debt. CBO's analysis indicates that even if values for those factors differed from the agency's projections, debt several decades from now would probably be much higher than it is today.

Furthermore, under alternative scenarios:

If lawmakers changed current laws to maintain certain major policies now in place—most significantly, if they prevented a cut in discretionary spending in 2020 and an increase in individual income taxes in 2026—then debt held by the public would increase even more, reaching 219 percent of GDP by 2049. By contrast, if Social Security benefits were limited to the amounts payable from revenues received by the Social Security trust funds, debt in 2049 would reach 106 percent of GDP, still well above its current level.

Over the long-term, the CBO projects that interest expense and mandatory spending categories (e.g., Medicare, Medicaid and Social Security) will continue to grow relative to GDP, while discretionary categories (e.g., Defense and other Cabinet Departments) continue to fall relative to GDP. Debt is projected to continue rising relative to GDP under the above two scenarios, although the CBO did also offer other scenarios that involved austerity measures that would bring the debt to GDP ratio down.

Risks and debates

CBO risk factors
The CBO reported several types of risk factors related to rising debt levels in a July 2010 publication:
 A growing portion of savings would go towards purchases of government debt, rather than investments in productive capital goods such as factories and computers, leading to lower output and incomes than would otherwise occur;
 If higher marginal tax rates were used to pay rising interest costs, savings would be reduced and work would be discouraged;
 Rising interest costs would force reductions in government programs;
 Restrictions to the ability of policymakers to use fiscal policy to respond to economic challenges; and
 An increased risk of a sudden fiscal crisis, in which investors demand higher interest rates.

Concerns over Chinese holdings of U.S. debt
According to a 2013 Forbes article, many American and other economic analysts have expressed concerns on account of the People's Republic of China's "extensive" holdings of United States government debt as part of their reserves. The National Defense Authorization Act of FY2012 included a provision requiring the Secretary of Defense to conduct a "national security risk assessment of U.S. federal debt held by China." The department issued its report in July 2012, stating that "attempting to use U.S. Treasury securities as a coercive tool would have limited effect and likely would do more harm to China than to the United States. An August 19, 2013  Congressional Research Service report said that the threat is not credible and the effect would be limited even if carried out. The report said that the threat would not offer "China deterrence options, whether in the diplomatic, military, or economic realms, and this would remain true both in peacetime and in scenarios of crisis or war."

A 2010 article by James K. Galbraith in The Nation, defends deficits and dismisses concerns over foreign holdings of United States government debt denominated in U.S. dollars, including China's holdings. In 2010, Warren Mosler, wrote that "When[ever] the Chinese redeem those T-securities, the money is transferred back to China's checking account at the Fed. During the entire purchase and redemption process, the dollars never leave the Fed." Australian economist Bill Mitchell argued that the United States government had a "nearly infinite capacity...to spend." An August 2020 Kyodo News report from Beijing, says that, against the backdrop of an escalation in Sino-U.S. tensions, financial markets are concerned that China might weaponize its holdings of over a $1 trillion of United States debt. If China undertakes a massive sales of its U.S. Treasury bonds, it would result in a decrease in the price of debt and an increase in interest rates in the United States, that would stifle American domestic "investment and consumer spending." However, a massive Chinese selloff, resulting in a drop in the price of debt, will also adversely impact China's proceeds on sale as well as the value of its remaining holdings.

Sustainability 
In 2009 the Government Accountability Office (GAO) reported that the United States was on a "fiscally unsustainable" path because of projected future increases in Medicare and Social Security spending. According to the Treasury report in October 2018, summarized by Business Insiders Bob Bryan, the U.S. federal budget deficit rose as a result of the Tax Cuts and Jobs Act of 2017 signed into law by President Donald Trump on December 22, 2017 and the Consolidated Appropriations Act, 2018 signed into law on March 23, 2018.

Risks to economic growth
Debt levels may affect economic growth rates. In 2010, economists Kenneth Rogoff and Carmen Reinhart reported that among the 20 developed countries studied, average annual GDP growth was 3–4% when debt was relatively moderate or low (i.e., under 60% of GDP), but it dips to just 1.6% when debt was high (i.e., above 90% of GDP). In April 2013, the conclusions of Rogoff and Reinhart's study came into question when a coding error in their original paper was discovered by Herndon, Ash and Pollin of the University of Massachusetts Amherst. Herndon, Ash and Pollin found that after correcting for errors and unorthodox methods used, there was no evidence that debt above a specific threshold reduces growth. Reinhart and Rogoff maintain that after correcting for errors, a negative relationship between high debt and growth remains. However, other economists, including Paul Krugman, have argued that it is low growth which causes national debt to increase, rather than the other way around.Vikas Bajaj (April 17, 2013) "Does High Debt Cause Slow Growth?", The New York Times; retrieved May 7, 2013.

Commenting on fiscal sustainability, former Federal Reserve Chairman Ben Bernanke stated in April 2010 that "Neither experience nor economic theory clearly indicates the threshold at which government debt begins to endanger prosperity and economic stability. But given the significant costs and risks associated with a rapidly rising federal debt, our nation should soon put in place a credible plan for reducing deficits to sustainable levels over time."

 Interest and debt service costs 

Despite rising debt levels, interest costs have remained at approximately 2008 levels (around $450 billion in total) because of lower than long-term interest rates paid on government debt in recent years. The federal debt at the end of the 2018/19 fiscal year (ended September 30, 2019) was $22.7 trillion. The portion that is held by the public was $16.8 trillion. Neither figure includes approximately $2.5 trillion owed to the government. Interest on the debt was $404 billion.

The cost of servicing the U.S. national debt can be measured in various ways. The CBO analyzes net interest as a percentage of GDP, with a higher percentage indicating a higher interest payment burden. During 2015, this was 1.3% GDP, close to the record low 1.2% of the 1966–1968 era. The average from 1966 to 2015 was 2.0% of GDP. However, the CBO estimated in 2016 that the interest amounts and % GDP will increase significantly over the following decade as both interest rates and debt levels rise: "Interest payments on that debt represent a large and rapidly growing expense of the federal government. CBO's baseline shows net interest payments more than tripling under current law, climbing from $231 billion in 2014, or 1.3% of GDP, to $799 billion in 2024, or 3.0% of GDP—the highest ratio since 1996."

According to a study by the Committee for a Responsible Federal Budget (CRFB), the U.S. government will spend more on servicing their debts than they do for their national defense budget by 2024.

Definition of public debt
Economists also debate the definition of public debt. Krugman argued in May 2010 that the debt held by the public is the right measure to use, while Reinhart has testified to the President's Fiscal Reform Commission that gross debt is the appropriate measure. The Center on Budget and Policy Priorities (CBPP) cited research by several economists supporting the use of the lower debt held by the public figure as a more accurate measure of the debt burden, disagreeing with these Commission members.

There is debate regarding the economic nature of the intragovernmental debt, which was approximately $4.6 trillion in February 2011. For example, the CBPP argues: that "large increases in [debt held by the public] can also push up interest rates and increase the amount of future interest payments the federal government must make to lenders outside of the United States, which reduces Americans' income. By contrast, intragovernmental debt (the other component of the gross debt) has no such effects because it is simply money the federal government owes (and pays interest on) to itself." However, if the U.S. government continues to run "on budget" deficits as projected by the CBO and OMB for the foreseeable future, it will have to issue marketable Treasury bills and bonds (i.e., debt held by the public) to pay for the projected shortfall in the Social Security program. This will result in "debt held by the public" replacing "intragovernmental debt".

Intergenerational equity

One debate about the national debt relates to intergenerational equity. For example, if one generation is receiving the benefit of government programs or employment enabled by deficit spending and debt accumulation, to what extent does the resulting higher debt impose risks and costs on future generations? There are several factors to consider:
 For every dollar of debt held by the public, there is a government obligation (generally marketable Treasury securities) counted as an asset by investors. Future generations benefit to the extent these assets are passed on to them.
 As of 2010, approximately 72% of the financial assets were held by the wealthiest 5% of the population. This presents a wealth and income distribution question, as only a fraction of the people in future generations will receive principal or interest from investments related to the debt incurred today.
 To the extent the U.S. debt is owed to foreign investors (approximately half the "debt held by the public" during 2012), principal and interest are not directly received by U.S. heirs.
 Higher debt levels imply higher interest payments, which create costs for future taxpayers (e.g., higher taxes, lower government benefits, higher inflation, or increased risk of fiscal crisis).
 To the extent the borrowed funds are invested today to improve the long-term productivity of the economy and its workers, such as via useful infrastructure projects or education, future generations may benefit.
 For every dollar of intragovernmental debt, there is an obligation to specific program recipients, generally non-marketable securities such as those held in the Social Security Trust Fund. Adjustments that reduce future deficits in these programs may also apply costs to future generations, via higher taxes or lower program spending.

Krugman wrote in March 2013 that by neglecting public investment and failing to create jobs, we are doing far more harm to future generations than merely passing along debt: "Fiscal policy is, indeed, a moral issue, and we should be ashamed of what we're doing to the next generation's economic prospects. But our sin involves investing too little, not borrowing too much." Young workers face high unemployment and studies have shown their income may lag throughout their careers as a result. Teacher jobs have been cut, which could affect the quality of education and competitiveness of younger Americans.

Credit default
The U.S. has never fully defaulted. In April 1979, however, the U.S. may have technically defaulted on $122 million in Treasury bills, which was less than 1% of U.S. debt. The Treasury Department characterized it as a delay rather than as a default, but it did have consequences for short-term interest rates, which jumped 0.6%. Others view it as a temporary, partial default.

Impact of the COVID-19 pandemic
The COVID-19 pandemic in the United States impacted the economy significantly beginning in March 2020, as businesses were shut-down and furloughed or fired personnel. About 16 million persons filed for unemployment insurance in the three weeks ending April 9. It caused the number of unemployed persons to increase significantly, which is expected to reduce tax revenues while increasing automatic stabilizer spending for unemployment insurance and nutritional support. As a result of the adverse economic impact, both state and federal budget deficits will dramatically increase, even before considering any new legislation.

To help address lost income for millions of workers and assist businesses, Congress and President Trump enacted the Coronavirus Aid, Relief, and Economic Security Act (CARES Act) on March 27, 2020. It included loans and grants for businesses, along with direct payments to individuals and additional funding for unemployment insurance. While the act carried an estimated $2.3 trillion price tag, some or all of the loans may ultimately be paid back including interest, while the spending measures should dampen the negative budgetary impact of the economic disruption. While the law will almost certainly increase budget deficits relative to the January 2020 10-year CBO baseline (completed prior to the COVID-19 pandemic), in the absence of the legislation, a complete economic collapse could have occurred.

CBO provided a preliminary score for the CARES Act on April 16, 2020, estimating that it would increase federal deficits by about $1.8 trillion over the 2020-2030 period. The estimate includes: 
A $988 billion increase in mandatory outlays; 
A $446 billion decrease in revenues; and 
A $326 billion increase in discretionary outlays, stemming from emergency supplemental appropriations.

CBO reported that not all parts of the bill will increase deficits: “Although the act provides financial assistance totaling more than $2 trillion, the projected cost is less than that because some of that assistance is in the form of loan guarantees, which are not estimated to have a net effect on the budget. In particular, the act authorizes the Secretary of the Treasury to provide up to $454 billion to fund emergency lending facilities established by the Board of Governors of the Federal Reserve System. Because the income and costs stemming from that lending are expected to roughly offset each other, CBO estimates no deficit effect from that provision.”

The Committee for a Responsible Federal Budget estimated that the budget deficit for fiscal year 2020 would increase to a record $3.8 trillion, or 18.7% GDP. For scale, in 2009 the budget deficit reached 9.8% GDP ($1.4 trillion nominal dollars) in the depths of the Great Recession. CBO forecast in January 2020 that the budget deficit in FY2020 would be $1.0 trillion, prior to considering the impact of the COVID-19 pandemic or CARES.  CFRB further estimated that the national debt would reach 106% of U.S. GDP in September 2020, a record since the aftermath of World War II.

COVID-19 pandemic and 2021 spendings
President Biden has spent significant amounts of money towards relief of the COVID-19 pandemic. According to a May 2021 report, Biden has or plans to spend $5.72 trillion dollars toward this effort and others such as climate change including providing stimulus checks and serving schools and low-income children. Many economists have agreed that this unprecedented level of spending from the Biden Administration has, in part, contributed to the inflation surge of 2021 and 2022 as a result of increasing the money supply in the economy.

Appendix
National debt for selected years

Interest paid
Note that this is all interest the U.S. paid, including interest credited to Social Security and other government trust funds, not just "interest on debt" frequently cited elsewhere.

Foreign holders of U.S. Treasury securities

The following is a list of the top foreign holders  of Treasury securities as listed by the Federal Reserve Board (revised by January 2023 survey):

Statistics

 U.S. official gold reserves  total 261.5 million troy ounces with a book value of approximately $11.04 billion.
 Foreign exchange reserves $140 billion . 
 The national debt was up to $80,885 per person as of 2020.
 The national debt equated to $59,143 per person U.S. population, or $159,759 per member of the U.S. working taxpayers, back in March 2016.
 In 2008, $242 billion was spent on interest payments servicing the debt, out of a total tax revenue of $2.5 trillion, or 9.6%. Including non-cash interest accrued primarily for Social Security, interest was $454 billion or 18% of tax revenue.
 Total U.S. household debt, including mortgage loan and consumer debt, was $11.4 trillion in 2005. By comparison, total U.S. household assets, including real estate, equipment, and financial instruments such as mutual funds, was $62.5 trillion in 2005.
 Total U.S. Consumer Credit Card revolving credit was $931.0 billion in April 2009.
 The U.S. balance of trade deficit in goods and services was $725.8 billion in 2005.
 According to the U.S. Department of Treasury Preliminary 2014 Annual Report on U.S. Holdings of Foreign Securities, the United States valued its foreign treasury securities portfolio at $2.7 trillion. The largest debtors are Canada, the United Kingdom, Cayman Islands, and Australia, whom account for $1.2 trillion of sovereign debt owed to residents of the U.S.
 The entire public debt in 1998 was equal to the cost of research, development, and deployment of U.S. nuclear weapons and nuclear weapons-related programs during the Cold War."The peak U.S. inventory was around 35,000 nuclear weapons. The United States spent more than $5.5 trillion on the nuclear arms race, an amount equal to its national debt in 1998 ..." 

A 1998 Brookings Institution study published by the Nuclear Weapons Cost Study Committee (formed in 1993 by the W. Alton Jones Foundation), calculated that total expenditures for U.S. nuclear weapons from 1940 to 1998 was $5.5 trillion in 1996 Dollars. The total public debt at the end of fiscal year 1998 was $5,478,189,000,000 in 1998 Dollars or $5.3 trillion in 1996 Dollars.

 International debt comparisons 

Sources: Eurostat, International Monetary Fund, World Economic Outlook (emerging market economies); Organisation for Economic Co-operation and Development, Economic Outlook (advanced economies)IMF,1China, Hong Kong, India, Indonesia, Korea, Malaysia, the Philippines, Singapore and Thailand2'''Afghanistan, Armenia, Australia, Azerbaijan, Bangladesh, Bhutan, Brunei Darussalam, Cambodia, China, People's Republic of, Fiji, Georgia, Hong Kong SAR, India, Indonesia, Japan, Kazakhstan, Kiribati, Korea, Republic of, Kyrgyz Republic, Lao P.D.R., Macao SAR, Malaysia, Maldives, Marshall Islands, Micronesia, Fed. States of, Mongolia, Myanmar, Nauru, Nepal, New Zealand, Pakistan, Palau, Papua New Guinea, Philippines, Samoa, Singapore, Solomon Islands, Sri Lanka, Taiwan, Tajikistan, Thailand, Timor-Leste, Tonga, Turkey, Turkmenistan, Tuvalu, Uzbekistan, Vanuatu, Vietnam

 Recent additions to the public debt of the United States 

Historical debt ceiling levels

 State and local government debt 

U.S. states have a combined state and local government debt of about $3 trillion and another $5 trillion in unfunded liabilities.

 See also 

 Criticism of the Federal Reserve
 Financial position of the United States
 List of countries by public debt
 Reduce America's Debt Now Act of 2011
 Sovereign default
 Troubled Asset Relief Program
 World debt

Notes

 References 

 Further reading 

 Andrew J. Bacevich, "The Old Normal: Why we can't beat our addiction to war", Harper's Magazine'', vol. 340, no. 2038 (March 2020), pp. 25–32. "In 2010, Admiral Michael Mullen, chairman of the Joint Chiefs of Staff, declared that the national debt, the prime expression of American profligacy, had become 'the most significant threat to our national security.' In 2017, General Paul Selva, Joint Chiefs vice chair, stated bluntly that 'the dynamics that are happening in our climate will drive uncertainty and will drive conflict." (p. 31.)

External links 

 Foreign Holdings of Federal Debt Congressional Research Service
 Historical Tables, Office of Management and Budget
 U.S. Treasury Resource Center – Treasury International Capital (TIC) System
 Real-time debt clock

 
Government debt by country
Economy of the United States
Government finances in the United States
United States federal budgets
United States fiscal cliff